Bibi Hakimeh (also Romanized as Bībī Ḩakīmeh; also known as Bībi Hakim) is a village in Bibi Hakimeh Rural District, in the Central District of Gachsaran County, Kohgiluyeh and Boyer-Ahmad Province, Iran. At the 2006 census, its population was 134, in 25 families.

References 

Populated places in Gachsaran County